The Carl Mollenkopf GmbH is a limited liability company (GmbH) based in Neckarsulm, Germany, focused on office supplies and stationery.

History
The company began with the acquisition by Carl Mollenkopf of a paper and stationery supply company founded in 1892. Until 1970, it sold primarily to medium-sized industrial, commercial, legal and municipal clients in Württemberg. In 1982 it moved to a newly constructed office and warehouse building just off the A6 in Neckarsulm, which enabled it to expand into nationwide delivery and attract large industrial clients. In 1993, the building was renovated and a new floor added to the administration building.

In 1997 Mollenkopf joined pbs Marketing GmbH, an association of family-run national businesses which provides marketing and data management.

In 1998 final plans were drawn up for a  modern office supply store.

Distinctions
In 1993 Mollenkopf was awarded first prize in the category of most beautiful specialist store nationwide in the Avis Best of Germany contest. The same year, it was admitted to Soennecken eG, the leading association for office supply stores in Europe. In 1994, the Ministry of the Environment of Baden-Württemberg honoured the company for its achievements in environmental protection.

In 2004 and again in 2006 Mollenkopf was publicly awarded a certificate by Eckart von Hrischhausen of the German division of the Rote Nasen (red noses) charity for sick children.

Sources
 Erfahrung seit 1892 - Meilensteine, Mollenkopf 
pbs article 
Retailer of the month 
mollenkopf – head of national marketing group 
md awarded "face of the industry" 
mollenkopf e-procurement article

External links

1892 establishments in Germany
Office supply companies of Germany